Phyllodactylus papenfussi is a species of gecko, a lizard in the family Phyllodactylidae. The species is endemic to Mexico.

Etymology
The specific name, papenfussi, is in honor of American herpetologist Theodore Johnstone Papenfuss (born 1941).

Geographic range
P. papenfussi is found in the Mexican state of Guerrero.

References

Further reading
Murphy, Robert W.; Blair, Christopher; de la Cruz, Fausto R. Mendez (2009). "A new species of leaf-toed gecko, genus Phyllodactylus (Squamata: Gekkota: Phyllodactylidae) from Guerrero, Mexico". South American Journal of Herpetology 4 (1): 17–24. (Phyllodactylus papenfussi, new species).
Palacios-Aguilar, Ricardo; Flores-Villela, Oscar (2018). "An updated checklist of the herpetofauna from Guerrero, Mexico". Zootaxa 4422 (1): 1-24.

Phyllodactylus
Reptiles of Mexico
Reptiles described in 2009